The 1949 Chico State Wildcats football team represented Chico State College—now known as California State University, Chico—as a member of the Far Western Conference (FWC) during the 1949 college football season. Led Roy Bohler in his eighth and final season as head coach, Chico State compiled an overall record of 2–6–1 with a mark of 1–2–1 in conference play, tying for third place in the FWC. The team was outscored by its opponents 148 to 83 for the season. The Wildcats played home games at Chico High School Stadium in Chico, California.

Bohler finished his tenure at Chico State with a record of 24–35–5, for a .414 winning percentage.

Schedule

Notes

References

Chico State
Chico State Wildcats football seasons
Chico State Wildcats football